The Lusitanian Catholic Orthodox Church (Portuguese: Igreja Católica Ortodoxa Lusitana) is a church denomination in Portugal claiming to be both  Catholic and Eastern Orthodox but in communion with neither the Catholic Church nor the Eastern Orthodox Church.

History

Catholic antecedents 
The Lusitanian Catholic Orthodox Church identifies its origins in the original undivided Christian community founded by Jesus, with its traditions first established by the Twelve Apostles.

Christianity came to Portugal with Saint Peter of Braga, a disciple of Saint James the Great, who sent him between 45 and 60 AD.

The legend says that Saint James, one of the apostles of Christ, visited the northwest of the Iberian Peninsula in 44 AD. One of his supposed visits was to Serra de Rates, in the current municipality of Póvoa de Varzim. During his visit, the apostle is to have ordained the local Peter of Rates as the first bishop Braga.

It is believed that Saint Peter of Rates was beheaded while converting believers of the Roman religion to the Christian faith.

The first historically recorded bishop of Braga was Paterno, who took part in the Council of Toledo in the year 400. The Metropolitan of Braga had canonical precedence over the diocese of Conímbriga, diocese of Viseu, diocese of Dume, diocese of Lamego, diocese of Porto and diocese of Egitânia (at present Idanha-a-Velha). The South of Portugal was under the Bishop of Evora and Lisbon.

In the year 1052, the Bishop of Rome, claiming authority over all West, and adding the "Filioque" in the Nicene Creed, leading many (generally Orthodox) churches to leave communion with Rome. In some places in the West, such as in Southern Italy, many bishops resisted.

Schism 
In the 19th century many priests dissented from the Roman Catholic Church in Portugal. Some of them joined the Lusitanian Catholic Apostolic Evangelical Church, others remained independent Catholics, celebrating mass underground.
In the 1980s some of these priests received episcopal ordination through Rapoza's line and the Old Calendarist Greek Orthodox Church and rebuilt Orthodox Catholicism in Portugal.

Doctrine 
The Lusitanian Orthodox Church accepts the seven ecumenical councils.
The Lusitanian Orthodox Church keeps the original Nicene Creed, accepted universally by the Church, East and West, during the first millennium without the addition of Filioque.

The Holy Communion is celebrated with both wine and bread, with the anamnesis, the Words of Institution and the Epiclesis of the Holy Spirit is a "consecrating formula".

The Lusitanian Orthodox Church believes the Original Sin has consequences in death, concupiscence and tendency toward sin in human nature, but not inheriting guilty for Adam's faults.

The Lusitanian Orthodox Church has always believed that the Mother of God (Theotokos) is the highest person above all humanity and the angels owing to her role as Mother of the Word Incarnate. But does not believe in her Immaculate Conception nor Assumption into Heaven.

The Lusitanian Orthodox Church  believes the Holy Spirit act in the humanity (Theosis) through the Incarnation, Death and Resurrection of our Lord, God and Saviour Jesus Christ who sends the Comforter.

The Lusitanian Orthodox Church rejects the idea of a purgatory.

Hierarchy 
The Lusitanian Orthodox Church is headed by the Orthodox Archbishop of Braga and Lisbon, who is also Metropolitan Primate of Portugal, Spain and All Brazil. The first titular has been João I, since his election at the I Local Council of the Lusitanian Orthodox Church, at 8 June 1997, by acclamation, and his enthronement, at 15 June 1997.
 
He is aided by the (auxiliary) titular bishops of Conímbriga, Viseu, Dume, Lamego, Evora and Egitânia.
 
The Portuguese territory is divided in three eparchies (dioceses) :
 the Metropolitan's proper Archeparchy of Braga, which besides spiritual oversee of the whole church take care of expatriate parishes and missions in London (UK), Brussels (Benelux), Lille, Paris (France), Geneve (Switzerland), Cambridge, Mass. (USA), São Paulo, Rio de Janeiro, Mississauga (Brazil), Canada and Cape Town (South Africa)
 the Eparchy of Lisbon, covering the south of Portugal and overseas islands : Azores and Madeira
 the Eparchy of Porto, serving the North of Portugal and Galicia.

The presbyters and deacons may marry before ordination.

There is one order of monastic life, called Order of Saint Basil (like the main Orthodox order), with eight monks and five nuns.

There are about 2,000 members and sympathizers, mostly in Northern Portugal.

Liturgy 
It follows the ancient Braga Rite celebrated in Portuguese,  with churches having iconostasis, facing East, the icons are painted rather than sculpted.

As in the Orthodox Liturgy, the bread of the Eucharist is leavened, and every member receives part of the wine and the bread.

Children are baptized by immersion.

It follows the Julian calendar of the Liturgic Year, like the Orthodox.

See also 
 Ecclesiastical history of Braga

References

Sources and external links 
 Lusitanian Orthodox Church Official Website

Independent Eastern Orthodox denominations
Eastern Orthodoxy in Portugal
Eastern Orthodoxy in Europe
Independent Catholic denominations